Ernest Edward Perley (23 December 1877 – 16 August 1948) was a Liberal, then Conservative, then National Government member of the House of Commons of Canada. He was born in Maugerville, New Brunswick and became a farmer.

Perley, the son of Senator William Dell Perley, attended public and secondary schools at Wolseley, then studied at Winnipeg's Wesley College.

He was a municipal councillor for Wolseley, Saskatchewan, becoming the community's mayor in 1921 and 1922.

He was first elected to Parliament at the Qu'Appelle riding in the 1930 general election with the Liberal party after making an unsuccessful attempt to win a seat there as a Conservative party candidate in 1921.

However, in the 1935 election, he switched back to the Conservatives and won re-election at Qu'Appelle. He was re-elected in 1940 when the Conservatives ran under the National Government banner. In the 1945 election, Perley (whose party had adopted the name Progressive Conservative) was defeated by Gladys Strum of the Co-operative Commonwealth Federation.

Electoral record

References

External links
 

1877 births
1948 deaths
Canadian farmers
Conservative Party of Canada (1867–1942) MPs
Liberal Party of Canada MPs
Mayors of places in Saskatchewan
Members of the House of Commons of Canada from Saskatchewan
People from Sunbury County, New Brunswick
Saskatchewan municipal councillors